ÖkoDAX is a German stock market index which includes ten companies in the renewable energy sector. It was introduced on 4 June 2007. The constituting companies and their weightings are reviewed quarterly (March, June, September and December). The companies should be represented with equal proportions (i.e. 10%). The ÖkoDAX is calculated as a performance index as well as a price index.

Development
The ÖkoDAX is based on Xetra. Its composition and weightings (price index) is shown below:

See also
 DAX
 MDAX
 Photovoltaik Global 30 Index
 SDAX
 TecDAX

External links
 ÖkoDAX performance, actual track

References

OkoDAX
Renewable energy commercialization